Gilman station is an Amtrak intercity train station in Gilman, Illinois, United States. The stop is on their Illini and Saluki route.

Service began at Gilman on October 26, 1986, when the Illini began stopping there. It was the first passenger service at Gilman since the creation of Amtrak on May 1, 1971. The northbound City of New Orleans also served Gilman until November 10, 1996 The previous railroad station in Gilman was in the center of the city, located at the diamond junction between Illinois Central's main line to New Orleans and the Toledo, Peoria and Western Railway (TP&W). The northwest quadrant of the junction contained the Illinois Central's main line to Springfield and St Louis, which split with the New Orleans main line just north of the station. The station building is still standing and is used by the Canadian National Railway's engineering department.

References

External links 

Gilman Amtrak Station (USA Rail Guide -- Train Web)

Amtrak stations in Illinois
Gilman, Illinois
Buildings and structures in Iroquois County, Illinois
Railway stations in the United States opened in 1986